Hogback Ridge is a  glaciated mountain ridge located in the Chugach Mountains, in the U.S. state of Alaska. This feature takes its name from the Hogback Glacier on its northern slopes, and in turn the glacier was named in 1898 by Captain William R. Abercrombie. Abercrombie led an 1898 expedition seeking a route from coastal Alaska to the Klondike. Precipitation runoff and meltwater from the mountain's glaciers drains into tributaries of the Lowe River, which in turn empties to Prince William Sound. The famous Horsetail Falls, which is located in Keystone Canyon, receives its source from the south slope of the mountain.

Climate

Based on the Köppen climate classification, Hogback Ridge is located in a subarctic climate zone with long, cold, snowy winters, and cool summers. Temperatures can drop below −20 °C with wind chill factors below −30 °C. This climate supports the Corbin, Keystone, and Hogback Glaciers on the mountain. The months May through June offer the most favorable weather for viewing and climbing.

See also

Geography of Alaska

References

Gallery

External links
 Weather forecast: Hogback Ridge

Mountains of Alaska
Landforms of Chugach Census Area, Alaska